Batanta is one of the four major islands in the Raja Ampat Islands in Southwest Papua province, Indonesia. Its area is 453 km² and its highest point is 1184 m. The Pitt Strait separates it from Salawati, while the Dampier Strait separates it from Waigeo.

Dampier Strait is named for the English explorer William Dampier. In 1759 Captain William Wilson sailing in the East Indiaman Pitt navigated these waters and named the channel between Batanta and Salawati Pitt Strait, after his vessel.

History 
Islam first arrived in the Raja Ampat archipelago in the 15th century due to political and economic contacts with the Bacan Sultanate. During the 16th and 17th centuries, the Sultante of Tidore had close economic ties with the island. During this period, Islam became firmly established and local chiefs had begun adopting Islam. Batanta was historically under the rule of Salawati Kingdom, one of the Raja Ampat (Four Kings).

Fauna 
The following reptile, mammal and bird species are found on the island: 
 Blue-spotted tree monitor (Varanus macraei)
 Crocodile Monitor (Varanus salvadorii)
 Wild boar (Sus scrofa) (prehistorically introduced)
 Black rat (Rattus rattus) (uncertain; introduced)
 Wilson's bird-of-paradise (Cicinnurus respublica)
 Myoictis wallacei (uncertain)
 Echymipera kalubu (uncertain)
 Phalanger orientalis
 Spilocuscus maculatus
 Paramelomys platyops
 Dobsonia beauforti
 Dobsonia magna
 Macroglossus minimus
 Nyctimene albiventer (Common tube-nosed fruit bat)
 Pteropus conspicillatus
 Rousettus amplexicaudatus
 Syconycteris australis
 Emballonura nigrescens
 Hipposideros cervinus
 Hipposideros diadema
 Hipposideros maggietaylorae
 Rhinolophus euryotis
 Miniopterus australis
 Myotis adversus (uncertain)
 Pipistrellus papuanus

References

Raja Ampat Islands